The Satelli D'Or Film Festival, or prior to 1990, The Ernest Satelli Celebration of Film Movie Festival, is a film festival with a focus on young filmmakers based in Hershey, Pennsylvania.

History 
Ernest Satelli was a projectionist working at the Carnivale Matinee movie theater in Hershey, Pennsylvania, who decided to start a film festival in order draw more people to the theater. The Festival, started in 1984, was originally called the Ernest Satelli Celebration of Film Movie Festival. The second year running, a young filmmaker named Alexander Payne won a top prize for his short called Carmen. Ernest Satelli died at 74 in 1989, but the festival continued in his honor. It was renamed the Satelli D'Or Film Festival in 1990, meaning Satellite of Gold, for its focus on attracting young talent. The Festival has featured early works of filmmakers such as M. Night Shyamalan, with Praying With Anger, and Richard Kelly, with his film The Goodbye Place.

Notable Filmmakers 
The Satelli D’Or Film Festival has housed the early short films of notable filmmakers, including:
Rameen Bahrani (Backgammon, 1998) who won the festival's top prize, the Satelli D'Or.
Marc Forster (Loungers, 1995) who won the Best Director prize.
Richard Kelly (The Goodbye Place, 1997) who won the Most Unique and Artistic Creation Award.
Alexander Payne (Carmen, 1985) who won the Satelli D'Or.
Robert Rodriguez (Bedhead, 1991) who won the Satelli D'Or.

Decline of the festival 
The 2003 festival held the lowest attendance rate and lowest poll rating scores in the history of the festival. The following year, films experimented with controversial themes, including the compulsion of human violence, sexual aggressiveness, and sexual repression. While the attendance rate for the film festival continued to decline, the poll scores improved drastically and. One filmmaker, who asked to remain anonymous, spoke to a reporter at the Press & Journal, a local newspaper in the small town of Middletown, Pennsylvania, saying, "It’s the damn attendance is what’s killing the festival. And the low attendance rate has halted the funding that festival used to get from local sponsors and the now defunct film office. We’re very concerned. The Satelli D’Or Film Festival is one of the very few festivals in the entire country where young filmmakers like me can express our talent and ideas and not worry about being patronized and shunned for them."

Controversy 
Critics have labeled films featured at the festival as "pornographic at best, and snuff material at worst." One festival entry, entitled Mud, followed the misadventures of a seventeen-year-old boy whose sexual fetishes included rubbing mud inside and around the orifices of virgins that he encounters and seduces. The film's auteur, Richard Preszer, was arrested and imprisoned for four months for "soliciting pornography." After this incident, a local film office halted their long-time funding of the festival. Another picture, entitled Cuts, followed a filmmaker named Paul who forces his actor to cut himself daily in order to get into the character he is playing. While the film was praised by locals for its gorgeous cinematography and powerful surrealistic images, many were turned off by the scenes of the actors cutting themselves, especially a scene involving a fourteen-year-old girl.

Local Politics 
Community groups have attempted to halt the Satelli D’Or Film Festival. Ernest Satelli, who was very open about his Marxist views, believed that the younger generation deserved a "safe haven where they can let their imagination run wild and have as much creative control as they please" and "be able to create the films that they’ve always wanted to make". When Ernest Satelli died in 1989, local art collectives organized to keep the festival in his honor.

Film festivals in Pennsylvania
Hershey, Pennsylvania
Film festivals established in 1984